Willi Forrer (born 3 July 1935) is a Swiss alpine skier. He competed in three events at the 1960 Winter Olympics.

References

External links
 

1935 births
Living people
Swiss male alpine skiers
Olympic alpine skiers of Switzerland
Alpine skiers at the 1960 Winter Olympics
Sportspeople from the canton of St. Gallen